The Murty Classical Library of India began publishing classics of Indian literature in January 2015. The books, which are in dual-language format with the original language and English facing, are published by Harvard University Press. The Columbia University scholar, Sheldon Pollock, is the library's general editor. Pollock previously edited the Clay Sanskrit Library. The library was established through a $5.2 million gift from Rohan Murty, the son of Infosys co-founder N. R. Narayana Murthy and social worker and author Sudha Murty. The series will include translations from Bengali, Gujarati, Hindi, Kannada, Marathi, Punjabi, Sanskrit, Tamil, Telugu, Urdu, other Indian languages and Persian. It will include fiction, poetry, nonfiction, and religious texts from all Indian traditions including Buddhism and Islam. The projected 500 volumes, to be published over a century, have a corpus of thousands of volumes of classic Indian literature to draw on.

Inception
Sheldon Pollock previously edited the Clay Sanskrit Library, whose funding had ended in 2008, and Pollock was searching for a new sponsor to continue the work in a wider format. Rohan Murty, as a PhD student in Computer Science at Harvard University, was taking courses in ancient Indian literature and philosophy from the Sanskrit Department and developed a deep interest in ancient Indian texts. The two were brought together by Gurcharan Das, leading to the establishment of the Murty Classical Library under the auspices of the Harvard University Press.

Volumes
January 2015
Therigatha: Poems of the First Buddhist Women, translated by Charles Hallisey, Murty Classical Library of India, Harvard University Press (January 2015), hardcover, 336 pages, .
The Story of Manu, by Allasani Peddana, translated by Velcheru Narayana Rao and David Shulman, Murty Classical Library of India, Harvard University Press (January 2015), hardcover, 656 pages, 
 Sur's Ocean: Poems from the Early Tradition, Surdas, edited by Kenneth E. Bryant, translated by John Stratton Hawley, Murty Classical Library of India, Harvard University Press (January 2015), hardcover, 1072 pages 
Sufi Lyrics, Bullhe Shah, edited and translated by Christopher Shackle, Murty Classical Library of India, Harvard University Press (January 2015), hardcover, 496 pages, 
The History of Akbar, Volume 1 (the Akbarnama), by Abu'l-Fazl ibn Mubarak, edited and translated by Wheeler Thackston, Murty Classical Library of India, Harvard University Press (January 2015), hardcover, 656 pages, 

January 2016
The History of Akbar, Volume 2 (the Akbarnama), by Abu'l-Fazl ibn Mubarak, edited and translated by Wheeler Thackston, Murty Classical Library of India, Harvard University Press (January 2016), hardcover, 624 pages, 
The Epic of Ram, Volume 1, (the Ramcharitmanas) by Tulsidas, translated by Philip Lutgendorf, Murty Classical Library of India, Harvard University Press (January 2016), hardcover, 432 pages, 
The Epic of Ram, Volume 2, (the Ramcharitmanas) by Tulsidas, translated by Philip Lutgendorf, Murty Classical Library of India, Harvard University Press (January 2016), hardcover, 560 pages, 
Arjuna and the Hunter, (the Kirātārjunīya) by Bharavi, edited and translated by Indira Viswanathan Peterson, Murty Classical Library of India, Harvard University Press (January 2016), hardcover, 480 pages,

Formats
Paperback versions of the books are available throughout the Indian subcontinent for the equivalent of USD 3 to USD 5, depending on the volume's size. Electronic editions of the works are planned for the future.

Criticism on the choice of General Editor
In March 2016, a petition initiated by Indian academicians demanded that Sheldon Pollock be removed from the editorship of the Murty Classical Library of India. The petition cites Rajiv Malhotra's book The Battle for Sanskrit, in which Pollock is a major topic. Malhotra criticizes Pollock for his methodologies, which are not being led by a traditional Dharmic point of view, and uses political philology which unearths "social abuses in the texts (against dalits, women, Muslims) as the predominant quality of those texts". According to Malhotra, Pollock takes an activist stance, calling "his peers to expunge the Sanskrit tradition of its inbuilt oppressiveness" which he describes as prescriptivism. Malhotra rejects these approaches, regarding them as a "bias" which threaten traditional approaches of Sanskrit texts. He adds, it is unfortunate that most Hindus are "largely unaware of what he has written."

In a response, Rohan Murty stated that Sheldon Pollock will continue his position, saying that the library will commission the "best possible scholar for that particular language. We will not judge on nationality, gender, race, creed or colour." He further questioned the intentions of the petitioners, noting that none of the petitioners had tried to contact him for the past six years.

See also
Columbia University Indo-Iranian Series
Harvard Oriental Series
Loeb Classical Library
National Library of India

Notes

References

External links
 

Indian literature
Dual-language series of texts
Translations into English
Murthy family